Avy Kaufman is an American casting director for film and television.

Early life, family and education

Kaufman is from Atlanta. She relocated to New York City in 1976 to study ballet.

Career
Kaufman originally worked in casting for advertising at Cone & Belding (often print ads) for six years, then transitioned to feature films.

Since 1987, she has worked in casting more than 150 film and television productions. Kaufman has worked with directors including Steven Spielberg, Ang Lee and Wes Craven.  Her casting credits include the psychological thriller film The Sixth Sense (1999), the romantic drama film Brokeback Mountain (2005) and the crime drama film Public Enemies (2009).

Accolades
Kaufman received the 2005 Hollywood Casting Director of the Year award given by the Hollywood Film Festival.

She received a 2008 Primetime Emmy Award for Outstanding Casting for a Drama Series for her work on Damages: Season 1 and in 2020 & 2022 for Primetime Emmy Award for Outstanding Casting for a Drama Series for Succession: Seasons 2-3.   She had earlier been nominated for a Primetime Emmy Award for Outstanding Casting for a Miniseries, Movie, or a Special for her work on the romance drama television miniseries Empire Falls.

Kaufman has been nominated for eighteen Artios Awards, and has won three.

Filmography

Television

See also

 List of people from New York City

References

External links 
 

Year of birth missing (living people)
Place of birth missing (living people)
20th-century births
American casting directors
Women casting directors
Living people
People from New York City
Primetime Emmy Award winners